The 2001 Philadelphia Wings season marked the team's fifteenth season of operation.

Regular season

Conference standings

Game log
Reference:

Playoffs
Tom Marechek on the 2001 Wings team, “I’d say the last world championship when the Wings won in 2001 in Toronto. We shocked the whole league winning as underdogs, but we were confident. We had a bunch of scrappy American defenders and a handful of Canadians. We went into Toronto with an attitude. 

They won it the two years before that and we did not play tough against them. That year, 2001, we put it together and we gelled at the right time. That was definitely the biggest highlight in my 12-year career as a Wing.”

Game log
Reference:

Roster
Reference:

See also
 Philadelphia Wings
 2001 NLL season
 Toronto Rock - Philadelphia Wings Finals Highlights

References

Philadelphia Wings seasons
Philadelphia Wings Season, 2001
National Lacrosse League Champion's Cup-winning seasons
Philadelphia Wings